The term nitroaniline in chemistry refers to a derivative of aniline (C6H5NH2) containing a nitro group (—NO2) There are three simple nitroanilines of formula C6H4(NH2)(NO2) which differ only in the position of the nitro group:

 2-Nitroaniline
 3-Nitroaniline
 4-Nitroaniline

Some more complicated molecules with other substituents can also be referred to as nitroanilines, for example 4-chloro-3-nitro-aniline.